The HoPWF Six-Man Tag Team Championship was a professional wrestling tag team title in the House of Pain Wrestling Federation promotion. It was created on October 5, 1999, when Slickyboy, Brian Anthony and Paul Beswick won a championship tournament in Hagerstown, Maryland. The title was defended primarily in the Mid-Atlantic and East Coast, most often in Maryland, but also in Pennsylvania and West Virginia until its retirement on January 12, 2001. There are 6 recognized known teams with a total of 6 title reigns.

Title history

References

Trios wrestling tag team championships